Halil Ürün (born 3 July 1968) is a Turkish politician from the Justice and Development Party (AKP), who has served as a Member of Parliament for Afyonkarahisar since 12 June 2011.

Born in Afyonkarahisar, he graduated from Selçuk University Faculty of Law and became a freelance lawyer. He was a mayoral candidate in both the 1994 and 1999, an applicant to become an MP in the 2002 general election and also an applicant to become a mayoral candidate in the 2009 local elections. He was elected as an AKP Member of Parliament in the 2011 general election and was re-elected in June 2015.

See also
24th Parliament of Turkey
25th Parliament of Turkey

References

External links
 MP profile on the Grand National Assembly website
 Collection of all relevant news items at Haberler.com

Justice and Development Party (Turkey) politicians
Deputies of Afyonkarahisar
Members of the 25th Parliament of Turkey
Living people
People from Afyonkarahisar
1968 births
Members of the 24th Parliament of Turkey
Members of the 26th Parliament of Turkey